Gouenzou is a village in north-western Ivory Coast. It is in the sub-prefecture of Sokoro, Minignan Department, Folon Region, Denguélé District.

Gouenzou was a commune until March 2012, when it became one of 1126 communes nationwide that were abolished.

Notes

Former communes of Ivory Coast
Populated places in Denguélé District
Populated places in Folon Region